Perdues dans New York (English: Lost in New York) is a 1989 made-for-television film directed by French director Jean Rollin, who is most notable for his cult vampire films. Perdues dans New York is one of his most personal films, having a runtime of just 52 minutes. In the 2010s, the film went viral when clips were used in an unofficial music video to Clams Casino's instrumental - "I'm God".

Plot
Two girls discover a magical wooden device, called a Moon Goddess, which allows them to travel through time and space. They imagine they are grown up and see New York City. Meeting again with their memories as old women, after a dreamlike journey of self-discovery, they return to their days of youth.

Home media

Perdues dans New York was released on DVD in the UK by Redemption Films on 16 July 2007 in a non-anamorphic 1.66:1 transfer with a Dolby 2.0 mono soundtrack. Extras included two of Rollin's early short films (Les Amours Jaunes and Les Pays Lion) and a stills gallery.

Reception

The film received negative reviews.

References

External links
 
 
 Perdues dans New York review Horrornews.net

1989 films
French television films
1980s French-language films
1989 drama films
Films directed by Jean Rollin
1980s French films